1784 in sports describes the year's events in world sport.

Boxing
Events
 March — Tom Johnson defeated Croydon Drover in London after 27 minutes.
 June — Tom Johnson defeated Stephen " Death " Oliver at Blackheath in a 35-minute fight. It's unknown if this was for the championship or not.

Cricket
Events
 First known appearance of a team representing the White Conduit Club, forerunner of Marylebone Cricket Club (MCC)
England
 Most runs – James Aylward 55
 Most wickets – William Bullen 8

Horse racing
England
 The Derby – Serjeant
 The Oaks – Stella
 St Leger Stakes – Omphale

References

 
1784